Clelandella miliaris is a species of sea snail, a marine gastropod mollusk in the family Trochidae, the top snails.

Description
The size of the shell varies between 7 mm and 18 mm. The imperforate, rather thin, but pretty solid shell has a strictly conical shape. It is whitish or yellowish, with more or less obvious longitudinal flames, often reduced to a few spots on the ribs and a row of spots at the periphery of each whorl. The surface is densely finely sculptured by spiral lirae crossed by very regular oblique lamellae, producing a clathrate pattern. The spiral lirae number about 6 on each whorl, but often double as many, by the intercalation of riblets in the interstices. The periphery has a prominent keel, cord-like, with secondary spiral striae, or bifid, cut into compressed granules, somewhat prominent above the sutures. The base has about 8 concentric ribs. The interstices are radiately striate, sometimes with a central riblet. The spire has a conical shape with about 7 whorls. The periphery is acutely angled. The base of the shell is flat. The aperture is quadrangular. The short columella is nearly straight.

Distribution
This marine species has a wide distribution. It occurs off Lofoten Islands, the North Sea (Norway to Gibraltar), off Cape Verde Islands, West Sahara and Mauritania; in the Mediterranean Sea and the Adriatic Sea. In the Baltic Sea it has become a vulnerable species.

References

External links
 

miliaris
Gastropods described in 1814
Molluscs of the Atlantic Ocean
Molluscs of the Mediterranean Sea
Fauna of the Adriatic Sea
Gastropods of Cape Verde
Fauna of the North Sea
Invertebrates of West Africa
Fauna of Western Sahara